Sawyerville is a village in Macoupin County, Illinois, United States. As of the 2020 census the population was 268.

Geography
Sawyerville is located in southeastern Macoupin County at  (39.078047, -89.806263). It is bordered to the north by the city of Benld. Illinois Route 4 passes through the west side of the village, leading north  to Gillespie and south  to Staunton, while Illinois Route 138 passes through the east side of the village, leading north to its terminus in Benld and east  to Interstate 55 at White City.

An unnamed stream forming a  ravine splits the village into a small eastern section and larger western section. The village is part of the Cahokia Creek watershed leading southwest to the Mississippi River.

Demographics

As of the census of 2000, there were 295 people, 117 households, and 84 families residing in the village. The racial makeup of the village was 97.63% White, 0.68% African American, 0.34% Native American, and 1.36% from two or more races.

There were 117 households, of which 31.6% had children under the age of 18 living with them, 57.3% were married couples living together, 12.8% had a female householder with no husband present, and 28.2% were non-families. 23.1% of all households were made up of individuals, and 13.7% had someone living alone who was 65 years of age or older. The average household size was 2.52 and the average family size was 2.96.

In the village, the population was spread out, with 24.1% under the age of 18, 9.2% from 18 to 24, 29.5% from 25 to 44, 19.3% from 45 to 64, and 18.0% who were 65 years of age or older. The median age was 38 years. For every 100 females, there were 98.0 males. For every 100 females age 18 and over, there were 91.5 males.

The median income for a household in the village was $28,571, and the median income for a family was $34,167. Males had a median income of $30,000 versus $16,500 for females. The per capita income for the village was $13,415. About 10.5% of families and 15.4% of the population were below the poverty line, including 17.9% of those under the age of eighteen and 22.6% of those 65 or over.

References

Villages in Macoupin County, Illinois
Villages in Illinois